Lazy Sunday may refer to:

"Lazy Sunday" (Small Faces song), a song released in 1968
"Lazy Sunday" (The Lonely Island song), a 2005 SNL digital short

See also 
Calvin and Hobbes, The Calvin and Hobbes Lazy Sunday Book